The Connors–McEnroe rivalry was a tennis rivalry between Jimmy Connors and John McEnroe, who played 34 times between 1977 and 1991. Their head-to-head was 20–14, favoring McEnroe.

Connors and McEnroe played again in the late 1990s and the early 2000s on the senior tour. With regard to their matches, Connors has stated, "Something like that never goes away, especially between Mac and myself...To have carried on this rivalry for so many years, and for you still to be talking about it, must mean that we made our mark somewhere." This rivalry is said to have been one of the most contentious and embittered in all of tennis history.

Head-to-head

Official matches (34)

Connors 14 – McEnroe 20

Head-to-head tallies 
The following is a breakdown of their head-to-head results:

 All matches: (34)  McEnroe 20–14
 All finals: (15)* Tied 7–7,   (1 Walkover not included in the head to head results)
 Grand Slam finals: Tied 1–1
 Grand Slam matches: McEnroe 6–3
 Masters matches: McEnroe 2–0
 WCT Finals matches: McEnroe 2–1
 Clay court matches: Connors 3–1
 Grass court matches: Connors 4–3
 Hard court matches: McEnroe 6–3
 Indoor matches: McEnroe 10–4

Other matches

Invitational matches

Connors–McEnroe (6–9)

ATP rankings

Year-end ranking timeline

ATP Year-end ranking timeline by age
Age at end of season

See also
 Borg–Connors rivalry
 Borg–McEnroe rivalry
 Lendl–McEnroe rivalry
 Connors–Lendl rivalry
 List of tennis rivalries

References

Jimmy Connors
John McEnroe
Tennis rivalries
Sports rivalries in the United States